This article concerns the period 649 BC – 640 BC.

Events and trends
Assyrian king Ashurbanipal founds library, which includes our earliest complete copy of the Epic of Gilgamesh.
649 BC — Indabigash succeeds Tammaritu as a king of the Elamite Empire.
649 BC — Babylonian revolt under Shamash-shuma-ukin is crushed by the Assyrians.
648 BC — Pankration becomes an event at the Ancient Olympic Games.
April 6, 648 BC—Earliest Greek-chronicled solar eclipse.
647 BC — King Assurbanipal of Assyria sacks Susa.
c. 647 BC — Assurbanipal and his Queen in the garden, from the palace at Nineveh (modern Kuyunjik, Iraq) is made. It is now in The British Museum, London.
645 BC—In the Chinese book of the Spring and Autumn Annals, it was recorded that on December 24 of this year there were five meteors seen in the sky over what is now northern Shanqiu County, Henan Province. It was the first Chinese recording of meteors.
641 BC — Tullus Hostilius dies and interregnum starts (traditional date).
640 BC: Decisive victory of Assyria over Elamite Empire; Assurbanipal captures its last king Khumma-Khaldash III, annexes Elam, and lays waste to the country.

Significant people
 645 BC—Death of Guan Zhong, Prime Minister of the Chinese state of Qi
 645 BC—Death of Archilochos, Greek poet (approximate date)
 644 BC—Death of Gyges, king of Lydia
 643 BC—Death of Manasseh of Judah
 643 BC—Death of Duke Huan of Qi in China
 641 BC—Josiah becomes king of Judah
 640 BC—Birth of Stesichorus, Greek poet (approximate date)

References